William Horsell (31 March 1807 – 23 December 1863) was an English hydrotherapist, publisher, and temperance and vegetarianism activist. Horsell published the first vegan cookbook in 1849.

Biography

Horsell was born in Brinkworth, Wiltshire. Before the age of twenty he was preaching the gospel and became a temperance activist in 1833. In 1838, Horsell established the Anti-Nicotine Society at Congleton, Cheshire. Horsell founded the Nature's Beverage Society in 1842. The Society aimed to spread abstinence from all artificial beverages.

Horsell operated a hydropathic infirmary at Northwood Villa, Ramsgate. It has been described as the first vegetarian hospital in Britain. In 1847, a meeting was held at the hospital from which the Vegetarian Society was formed. Horsell was secretary of the Vegetarian Society for several years. In 1856, Horsell noted that there were a thousand members of the Society. He managed the Society from his London office.

Horsell edited the Truth Tester, which became the Society's official journal. The journal described vegetarianism as "the next practical moral subject which is likely to call forth the virtuous energy of society". In 1850, it was renamed the Vegetarian Advocate. Horsell stepped down as Secretary and his journal ceased in 1850. From 1849, the Vegetarian Society's President James Simpson published the Vegetarian Messenger. In 1850, Simpson moved the Vegetarian Society office to Manchester and Vegetarian Messenger became the Society's official journal. Horsell remained active with the London branch of the Vegetarian Society.

Another publication of Horsell's was the monthly The Journal of Health & Phrenological Magazine which amongst its contributors was the popular temperance lecturer Jabez Inwards, a fellow teetotaler and phrenologist .

He authored a popular hydropathic manual and was an advocate of phrenology. He was a publisher for vegetarian and spiritualist literature. His wife Elizabeth Horsell was also a vegetarian.

Horsell was a London agent for the Fowler & Wells Company.

In 1849, Horsell published Asenath Nicholson's Kitchen Philosophy for Vegetarians, in London. A review in the Vegetarian Advocate, noted that "butter and eggs are excluded" from the recipes. The Vegan Society have cited the book as the first vegan cookbook.

Horsell died of a fever, while on board the Just, on 23 December 1863, while on an anti-slavery mission to Nigeria. He was buried in Lagos Cemetery, West Africa.

Selected publications

The Board of Health & Longevity (1845)
Cholera Prevented by the Adoption of a Vegetarian Diet (1849)
Original Views on Diet (1849)
Hydropathy for the People (1850)
The Vegetarian Armed at All Points (1856)
The Science of Cooking Vegetarian Food (1856)

References

Further reading

'Zealously affected in a good thing' The publishing career and life of William Horsell (1807‒1863). James Gregory.

1807 births
1863 deaths
19th-century English businesspeople
British vegetarianism activists
English abolitionists
English cookbook writers
English publishers (people)
English temperance activists
Hydrotherapists
People associated with the Vegetarian Society
People from Wiltshire
Phrenologists